Richard Edward Connell Jr. (October 17, 1893 – November 22, 1949) was an American author and journalist. He is best remembered for his short story "The Most Dangerous Game" (1924). Connell was one of the most popular American short story writers of his time. His stories were published in The Saturday Evening Post and Collier's magazines. He had equal success as a journalist and screenwriter, and was nominated for an Academy Award in 1942 (Best Original Story) for the movie Meet John Doe (1941), directed by Frank Capra and based on his 1922 short story "A Reputation".

Connell was born on October 17, 1893, in Poughkeepsie, New York, the son of Richard E. Connell and Mary Miller Connell. He began his writing career for The Poughkeepsie Journal, and attended Georgetown College for a year before going to Harvard University. While at Harvard, Connell edited The Lampoon and The Crimson. He subsequently worked on the city staff of The New York American and as a copy writer for J. Walter Thompson. Connell served in France with the US Army during World War I. While in the army, he was the editor of his camp's newspaper. After the war, he turned to writing short stories, and eventually wrote over 300.

Screenplays
 The Most Dangerous Game (1932) (contributing writer)
 The Milky Way (1936) (writer)
 F-Man (1936) (writer)
 Love on Toast (1937) (writer)
 Okusama ni shirasu bekarazu (1937) (writer)
 The Cowboy and the Lady (1938) (contributing writer) (uncredited)
 Doctor Rhythm (1938) (writer)
 Hired Wife (1940) (writer)
 Nice Girl? (1941) (writer)
 Rio Rita (1942) (screenplay)
 Presenting Lily Mars (1943) (screenplay)
 Two Girls and a Sailor (1944) (writer)
 Thrill of a Romance (1945) (writer)
 Her Highness and the Bellboy (1945) (writer)
 Luxury Liner (1948) (writer)

Novels
 The Mad Lover (1928)
 Murder at Sea (1929)
 Playboy (1936)
 What Ho! (1937)

Short story collections

The Sin of Monsieur Pettipon and Other Humorous Tales (1922) – Also known as Mister Braddy's Bottle and Other Humorous Tales
Apes and Angels (1924) – Includes "The Man Who Could Imitate a Bee".
Variety (1925) – Includes "The Most Dangerous Game".
Ironies (1930) – Includes "The Law Beaters".
The Most Dangerous Game

References

External links
 
 
 
 
 
 
 Richard Connell at The American Film Institute Catalog of Motion Pictures
 Additional biography and text of The Most Dangerous Game
 Works by Richard Connell (public domain in Canada)
 Louise Fox Connell Papers, 1904-1986 at Harvard University Library

1893 births
1949 deaths
20th-century American poets
20th-century American short story writers
American male novelists
American male poets
American male short story writers
Writers from Poughkeepsie, New York
Harvard University alumni
20th-century American male writers
Novelists from New York (state)
Georgetown College (Georgetown University) alumni